Events in the year 1945 in the Netherlands.

Incumbents
 Monarch: Wilhelmina
 Prime Minister: Pieter Sjoerds Gerbrandy (until 25 June); Willem Schermerhorn (from 25 June)

Events 
Dutch famine of 1944–45
3 March – Bombing of the Bezuidenhout
5 April to 20 May – Georgian uprising on Texel
7 to 8 April – Operation Amherst
12 to 16 April – Liberation of Arnhem
17 April – Inundation of the Wieringermeer
13 May 1945 German deserter execution

Births 

4 January – Jean Bessems, carom and artistic billiards player
6 January – Anja Meulenbelt, politician and writer
10 January – Henri Bol, still life painter (d. 2000)
25 January – Lennaert Nijgh, lyricist (d. 2002)
3 February – Willeke Alberti, singer and actress
16 February – Toon van Driel, cartoonist, comics writer and comics artist
16 February – L. H. Wiener, writer
17 February – Chris Dolman, martial artist and professional wrestler
3 March – Gee van Enst, rower.
14 March – René de Boer, sculptor
14 March – Herman van Veen, stage performer, actor, author, singer/songwriter and musician
28 March – Bert Groen, corporate director, civil servant and politician
29 March – Willem Ruis, game show presenter (d. 1986)
4 May – Jan Mulder, footballer, writer, columnist, and TV personality
8 May – Arthur Docters van Leeuwen, politician, jurist and civil servant
20 May – Saskia Holleman, actress, lawyer and model (d. 2013).
25 May – Nicolaas Matsier, novelist
12 June – Gaby Minneboo, cyclist
15 June – Corrie Bakker, track and field athlete.
16 June – Roy Ho Ten Soeng, politician
20 June – Jan Dietz, information systems researcher
9 July – Erik van der Wurff, pianist, composer, arranger, producer and conductor (d. 2014)
17 August – Rudi Lubbers, boxer.
27 August – Jan Sloot, electronics engineer (d. 1999)
28 September – Vincent Mentzel, photographer
24 October – Ernst Jansen Steur, neurologist
30 October – Fred Rompelberg, cyclist
2 November – Cees Stam, track cyclist
19 November – Hans Monderman, road traffic engineer and innovator (d. 2008)
27 November – Phil Bloom, artist, entertainer and actress

Full date missing
Christian Dumolin, businessman
Henk van der Flier, psychologist
Jan Plas, kickboxer (d. 2010)
Madelon Vriesendorp, artist

Deaths 

2 January – Arie Bijl, physicist (b. 1908)
30 January – Jur Haak, footballer (b. 1890)
1 February – Johan Huizinga, historian (b. 1972)
9 February – Piet Klijnveld, accountant (b. 1874)
12 February – Walraven van Hall, banker and resistance leader (b. 1906)
17 February – Gabrielle Weidner, resistance fighter (b. 1914)
1 April – Piet Tekelenburg, footballer (b. 1894)
15 April – Joannes Cassianus Pompe, pathologist (b. 1901)
17 April – Hannie Schaft, communist resistance fighter during World War II (b. 1920)
28 May – Lothar van Gogh, footballer (b. 1888)
16 August – Nico Richter, composer (b. 1915)
25 August – Henriëtte van der Meij, feminist (b. 1850)
7 September – Harry Kuneman, governor (b. 1886)
22 October – Jac. van Ginneken, linguist, priest and Jesuit (b. 1877)
13 November – Albert Heijn, entrepreneur (b. 1865)

Full date missing
Anne Frank, diarist (b. 1929)
Margot Frank (b. 1926)

See also
Chronology of the liberation of Dutch cities and towns during World War II

References

 
1940s in the Netherlands
Years of the 20th century in the Netherlands
Netherlands
Netherlands